Taprobana, Trapobana, and Taprobane was the name by which the Indian Ocean island of Sri Lanka was known to the ancient Greeks.

History 
Reports of the island's existence were known before the time of Alexander the Great as inferred from Pliny. The treatise De Mundo, supposedly by Aristotle (died 322 BC) but according to others by Chrysippus the Stoic (280 to 208 BC), incorrectly states that the island is as large as Great Britain (in fact, it is only about one third as big). The name was first reported to Europeans by the Greek geographer Megasthenes around 290 BC. Herodotus (444 BC) does not mention the island. The first Geography in which it appears is that of Eratosthenes (276 to 196 BC) and was later adopted by Claudius Ptolemy (139 AD) in his geographical treatise to identify a relatively large island south of continental Asia. Writing during the era of Augustus, Greek geographer Strabo makes reference to the island, noting that "Taprobane sends great amounts of ivory, tortoise-shell and other merchandise to the markets of India.". Eratosthenes' map of the (for the Greeks) known world, c. 194 BC also shows the island south of India called Taprobane.

Stephanus of Byzantium writes that a metropolis of the island was called Argyra ("Silver"). and that also there was a river which was called Phasis.

Aelian wrote that he had heard that the island does not have cities, but 750 villages.

The identity of Ptolemy's Taprobane has been always associated with the present day Sri Lanka from maps of ancient antiquity until the medieval maps of Abu-Rehan (1030) and Edrisi (1154) and in the writing of Marco Polo (1292). Furthermore, most of the place names marked on the map can be identified with place name of the places in ancient Sri Lanka. 

 Talakori port -Tadduvankoddi (Tamil)
 Margana Port from Mannārama port (Sinhalese), currently known as Manthai
 Anoubingara Port from Arunagiri Nagar port (Tamil), presently known as Trincomalee,
 Anourogrammoi - from Anur̄adhagr̄ma (Sinhalese), which later became Anuradhapura (Sinhalese)
 Bokana Port  from the Okanda port (Sinhalese)
 Korkobara Port from the Godawaya port (Sinhalese)
 Rogondanai Region from the Rohaṇa region (Sinhalese)
Also, the relative position of the island in comparison to India, being centrally situated on the Indian Ocean trade route and a major trading center for trade in elephants and golden spice as described by ancient Greek and Roman travelers, further validate the assignment of the name to Sri Lanka.

However, on the maps of the Middle Ages, the fashion of using Latinised names and delineating places with fanciful figures contributed to absurd designs and confusion regarding the actual place of Taprobane. In the fifteenth century, Niccolò de' Conti mistakenly identified Taprobana as a much smaller island. In 1507, Martin Waldseemuller still assigned Taprobana to Sri Lanka. Sebastian Munster's 1580 map identified Taprobana as Sumatra, where the German title, Sumatra Ein Grosser Insel, means, "Sumatra, a large island". Munster's map created a debate on the identity of Taprobane. Due to this debate following possibilities were considered valid for Taprobana in the Middle Ages:
 Sri Lanka, as in Ptolemy's map and climes
 Sumatra, as in the birthplace of Enrique of Malacca
 A phantom island
However, this issue was resolved with the rediscovery of Ptolemy's work in the 1400s. Ptolemy's map had been lost since the time of its production around the 2nd century AD. However, copies were rediscovered in the Middle East around 1400 AD. Moreover, by that time, the Portuguese had made their way into Asia. They had knowledge of both Sri Lanka (then Ceylan) and Sumatra from at least 80 years before. Munster apparently based his identification of Taprobane with Sumatra on 16th-century knowledge. Therefore, it can be mostly believed that this one-off identification of Taprobane with Sumatra was possible due to misassignment.

Taprobana is mentioned in the first strophe of the Portuguese epic poem Os Lusíadas by Luís de Camões (c. 1524 – 10 June 1580).

In literary works, Taprobana was mentioned in Tommaso Campanella's The City of the Sun, written in 1602. Jorge Luis Borges mentions the island in the story The Lottery in Babylon  in the collection The Garden of Forking Paths (1941) of his book Fictions (1944). Toprobana is the fictional location of the sky elevator in Arthur C. Clarke's science fiction novel The Fountains of Paradise (1979). British rock band My Vitriol's 2001 debut album Finelines features a track called Taprobane, courtesy of the band's lead singer Som Wardner who is of Sri Lankan origin.

See also
 Waldseemüller map

References

External links

 

Islands of the Indian Ocean
Names of Sri Lanka
Ancient Greek geography of Sri Lanka
Ancient Greek geography